The Euplocaminae are a subfamily of moth of the family Tineidae.

Genera
 Euplocamus

References